Dorothy Chiyoko Sueoka Casterline (born ) is a deaf linguist known for her contribution to A Dictionary of American Sign Language on Linguistic Principles, considered a foundational work of sign language linguistics.

Casterline was born Dorothy Sueoka in the late 1920s, to parents of Japanese descent, and she grew up in Honolulu, Hawaii. After graduating from the Hawaii School for the Deaf and the Blind, then known as the Diamond Head School for the Deaf, she obtained a bachelor's degree in English from Gallaudet University in Washington, D.C., in 1958. As Hawaii was not yet a U.S. state at the time, she was considered one of the first international students to attend the university, as well as the first deaf Hawaiian student to graduate.

Around this time, she wed fellow Gallaudet graduate Jim Casterline, whom she was married to until his death in 2012.

Casterline went on to spend over 30 years teaching English and researching American Sign Language at Gallaudet. She was involved in the growth and development of the university's Linguistic Research Laboratory.

While at Gallaudet, she and her colleague Carl Croneberg were recruited by the linguist William Stokoe to contribute to his Dictionary of American Sign Language on Linguistic Principles. Published in 1965, the dictionary is considered a seminal text in the study of ASL, which promoted greater interest in and respect for the language. It was innovative in treating ASL as a real and natural language, rather than a variant of English. Casterline played an important role as a deaf collaborator with the hearing professor Stokoe over the several years it took to produce the dictionary. Stokoe also valued the multicultural makeup of his team, with Casterline's Asian Pacific Islander background and Croneburg's Swedish one.

In 2022, Casterline was given an honorary doctorate of humane letters from Gallaudet, in recognition of her contributions to ASL linguistics and deaf studies.

References 

Living people
People from Honolulu
Linguists from the United States
Gallaudet University faculty
Gallaudet University alumni
American deaf people
Hawaii people of Japanese descent
Linguists of sign languages
People involved with sign language
Year of birth missing (living people)